Nai Wai aka. Wong Kong Wai is a walled village in Lam Tei, Tuen Mun District, Hong Kong.

Administration
Nai Wai is a recognized village under the New Territories Small House Policy. It is one of the 36 villages represented within the Tuen Mun Rural Committee. For electoral purposes, Nai Wai is part of the Tuen Mun Rural constituency, which is currently represented by Kenneth Cheung Kam-hung.

History
Nai Wai was established by the To Clan.

Several villages of the Lam Tei area were established by the To Clan. Originally from Poyang, Jiangxi (other sources mention Watlam in Guangxi), the To Clan moved to Ngau Tam Mei and then to Tuen Mun Tai Tsuen. Following the increase of the clan population, the village dispersed and developed into five villages in the Lam Tei area: Nai Wai, Tsing Chuen Wai, Tuen Tsz Wai, Lam Tei Tsuen and Tuen Mun San Tsuen, which were all fortified.

According to different sources, Nai Wai may have been established around 1368-1398 or during the reign of Qianlong Emperor (1735-1796).

Nai Wai appears on the "Map of the San-On District", published in 1866 by Simeone Volonteri.

Features
Nai Wai was a walled village with four watch towers at the four corners of the square village. The entrance gate was moved to the present southern outer row of houses with its entrance facing south about 200 years ago due to feng shui reasons.

See also
 Walled villages of Hong Kong, including nearby Sun Fung Wai (adjacent), Tsing Chuen Wai and Tuen Tsz Wai
 Nai Wai stop
 Tuen Mun River

References

External links

 Delineation of area of existing village Nai Wai (Tuen Mun) for election of resident representative (2019 to 2022)
 Antiquities and Monuments Office. Hong Kong Traditional Chinese Architectural Information System. Nai Wai
 Antiquities Advisory Board. Picture of the entrance gate
 Antiquities Advisory Board. Historic Building Appraisal. Shrine, Nai Wai Picture
 Pictures of Nai Wai and other villages of Lam Tei
 Cultural Heritage Impact report

Walled villages of Hong Kong
Villages in Tuen Mun District, Hong Kong
Lam Tei